The 1951-52 Segunda División de México season was the second tournament in this competition. It counted with the participation of ten teams. La Piedad was the winner.

Teams

League standings

Results

Moves
La Piedad was promoted to First Division.
Veracruz was relegated from First Division.
After this season Atlético Veracruz; Cuautla; Estrella Roja and Monterrey joined the league.
Pachuca was dissolved

References

Mexico 1951/52 RSSSF
Mexico - List of Final Tables Second Division (1950-1995)

Mex
1951–52 in Mexican football
Segunda División de México seasons